Holland is a town in Cass Township, Dubois County, in the U.S. state of Indiana. The population was 626 at the 2010 census. It is part of the Jasper Micropolitan Statistical Area.

History
Holland was platted in 1859 by Henry Kunz, a native of Germany. It was named for Holland (The Netherlands).

The Holland post office has been in operation since 1856.

Geography
Holland is located at  (38.245942, -87.038354).

Demographics

2010 census
At the 2010 census, there were 626 people, 252 households and 168 families living in the town. The racial makeup of the town was 96.0% White, 0.2% African American, 0.6% Native American, 0.3% Asian, 0.2% Pacific Islander, 2.2% from other races, and 0.5% from two or more races. Hispanic or Latino of any race were 3.7% of the population.

There were 252 households, of which 31.7% had children under the age of 18 living with them, 52.4% were married couples living together, 10.7% had a female householder with no husband present, 3.6% had a male householder with no wife present, and 33.3% were non-families. 27.4% of all households were made up of individuals, and 13.5% had someone living alone who was 65 years of age or older. The average household size was 2.48 and the average family size was 3.04.

The median age was 37.9 years. 26% of residents were under the age of 18; 5.8% were between the ages of 18 and 24; 27.4% were from 25 to 44; 24.1% were from 45 to 64; and 16.6% were 65 years of age or older. The population was 48.2% male and 51.8% female.

2000 census
At the 2000 census, there were 695 people, 270 households and 190 families living in the town. The racial makeup was 98.13% White, 0.29% Native American, 0.43% Asian, 0.86% from other races, and 0.29% from two or more races. Hispanic or Latino of any race were 2.16% of the population.

There were 270 households, of which 36.3% had children under the age of 18 living with them, 58.9% were married couples living together, 8.1% had a female householder with no husband present, and 29.3% were non-families. 26.3% of all households were made up of individuals, and 14.1% had someone living alone who was 65 years of age or older. The average household size was 2.57 and the average family size was 3.12.

28.6% of the population were under the age of 18, 7.9% from 18 to 24, 29.4% from 25 to 44, 18.8% from 45 to 64, and 15.3% who were 65 years of age or older. The median age was 35 years. For every 100 females, there were 93.6 males. For every 100 females age 18 and over, there were 97.6 males.

The median household income was $35,500 and the median family income was $44,271. Males had a median income of $30,833 females $21,563. The per capita income was $16,179. About 5.0% of families and 9.2% of the population were below the poverty line, including 15.2% of those under age 18 and 8.4% of those age 65 or over.

References

External links
 Town of Holland, Indiana website

Communities of Southwestern Indiana
Towns in Dubois County, Indiana
Towns in Indiana
Jasper, Indiana micropolitan area
Populated places established in 1859
1859 establishments in Indiana